Bukas na Lang Kita Mamahalin (International title: Tomorrow Can Wait / ) is a 2013 Philippine drama television series starring Dawn Zulueta and Gerald Anderson. The series aired on ABS-CBN's Primetime Bida evening block and worldwide on The Filipino Channel from September 2, 2013, to November 15, 2013.

Synopsis 
The story revolves around a tormented son, Miguel, because of the tragic incident that happened to his father who was wrongfully convicted of a crime he did not commit; the murder of a senator whom he befriended, and died after a rumble inside the prison. As he grows up into a trouble-prone young man, the trauma of the past haunts him in the present when he is accused as one of the suspects in a rape case. Having put in the same situation, he believes that he will not end up like his father who never had a chance to prove his innocence. On his ultimate journey in finding justice for his case with the help of his beloved mother, he coincidentally discovers the means that can clear his father's name and the truth behind the co-existence of their fates. It is the story of seeking justice against all odds and laws.

Cast and characters

Main cast
 Gerald Anderson as Miguel Dizon
 Dawn Zulueta as Zenaida Dizon/Ramirez
 Cristine Reyes as Amanda Suarez-Dizon/Sophia
 Diana Zubiri as Carla Melendez
 Rayver Cruz as Marcus Ramirez
 Tonton Gutierrez as Richard Ramirez
 Dina Bonnevie as Victoria Antonio

Supporting cast
 Lito Legaspi as Melchor Antonio
 Rey "PJ" Abellana as Jimmy Suarez
 Rommel Padilla as Raul Gimeno
 Thou Reyes as Joaquin Bernal
 Franco Daza as Alex Baldemor
 Madeleine Nicolas as Lumen Melendez
 Nico Antonio as John Boy Sanchez
 Vince Angeles as Gabby
 Justin Cuyugan as Armando Angeles
 Janus del Prado as Elvis

Guest cast
 Dindo Arroyo as Jomar
 Jong Cuenco as Atty. Orosco
 Rubi Rubi as Lydia Bernal
 Maritess Joaquin as Tessie
 Dominic Ochoa as Ramon Vilchez
 Ramon Christopher as Roland Reyes
 Michael Flores as Hudas
 Ronnie Lazaro as Benjie
 Jose Sarasola as Jessie
 Nanding Josef as Fernando Adanza
 Simon Ibarra as Tomas
 Jordan Castillo
 Benjamin de Guzman as Bart
 Alexandra Macanan as Gimeno's daughter
 Gilleth Sandico as Gimeno's wife
 Marina Benipayo as Jessica Tuazon
 Menggie Cobarrubias
 Manuel Chua

Special participation
 Gabby Concepcion as Martin Dizon
 Noel Trinidad as Sen. Renato Angeles
 Sharlene San Pedro as teenage Amanda
 Andrea Brillantes as teenage Carla
 Jairus Aquino as teenage Marcus
 Nash Aguas as teenage Miguel

Episodes

Reception

See also 
List of programs broadcast by ABS-CBN
List of telenovelas of ABS-CBN

References 

ABS-CBN drama series
2013 Philippine television series debuts
2013 Philippine television series endings
Philippine action television series
Thriller television series
Television series by Dreamscape Entertainment Television
Filipino-language television shows
Television shows set in the Philippines